Bernát Bettelheim or Bernard Jean Bettelheim ( or ; 1811, Pozsony, Hungary - February 9, 1870 Brookfield, Missouri, USA) was a Hungarian-born Christian missionary to Okinawa, the first Protestant missionary to be active there.

Biography
Bettelheim was born into a noted Hungarian-Jewish family in Pressburg (Pozsony), Kingdom of Hungary, (today Bratislava, Slovakia), in 1811. He studied, from a very early age, towards the goal of becoming a rabbi. He considered himself Hungarian. It is said that by the age of ten beside Hungarian he could read and write in French, German, and Hebrew, though if his biographies are to be believed, he left home at 12 to become a teacher and continued his studies at five different schools. Bettelheim earned a degree in medicine from a school in Padua, Italy in 1836, and is said to have gone on to file no fewer than 47 "scientific dissertations" within the following three years. He traveled much in these years, practicing medicine in a number of Italian cities, aboard an Egyptian naval vessel, and in a Turkish town called Magnesia, where, in 1840, he began studying Christianity. He converted to Christianity, and was baptized a short time later, in Smyrna.

During his time in the Ottoman Empire, he held theological debates with local rabbis and published pamphlets on the matter in French; after facing salary disputes in Constantinople and resigning his post, Bettelheim made his way to London, where he hoped to gain authorization from the Church of England to preach to the Jewish communities of the Mediterranean. During this time, he became associated with a number of other prominent missionaries to the Far East, including Dr. Peter Parker, Karl Gützlaff, and missionary to Africa David Livingstone. Following several months of disputes with the Church of England, who refused to recognize his European degrees, insisted he study at Oxford or Cambridge, and were suspicious of someone who had so recently converted from Judaism, Bettelheim abandoned that particular quest, though he remained in London.

Bettelheim became a naturalized British subject sometime later, married the daughter of a prominent thread producer, and, in 1844, his first child was born; she was named Victoria Rose. Following further disputes with various Christian organizations, including the London Society for Promoting Christianity Among the Jews (a Jewish Christian missionary society now known as the Church's Ministry Among Jewish People or CMJ), he accepted an appointment as medical missionary to Naha with the Loochoo Naval Mission. Leaving from Portsmouth on 9 September 1845, the Bettelheims arrived in Hong Kong in January the following year; their second child, Bernard James Gutzlaff Bettelheim, was born en route, at sea. After several months in Hong Kong, studying Chinese and mingling with British missionary society there, Bettelheim departed for Okinawa with his family in April 1846.

In Okinawa

Bettelheim arrived in Okinawa from Hong Kong on April 30, 1846, accompanied by his wife, Elizabeth M., their infant daughter, Victoria Rose (born 1844), their infant son, Bernard James (born November 1845), "Miss Jane", a tutor and schoolmistress, and Liu Yu-Kan, a Cantonese translator, on board the British ship Starling. The ship was welcomed at Naha by the local port master, who objected to the missionary's disembarking; the Starling's captain did not challenge him, and aimed to keep the Bettelheims on board. However, Dr. Bettelheim had other ideas. He bribed several members of the crew to help him in transporting his possessions into the Okinawan ships, while the doctor invited a number of Okinawan dockhands below decks, and entertained them with drink. Intoxicated, the Okinawans were persuaded to take the Bettelheims, and their possessions ashore; when they arrived it had already grown dark and was too late to turn back. The local officials offered the family shelter in the Gokoku-ji temple for the night, and the priests in residence there left, out of respect for the women's privacy. The following morning, the Bettelheims refused to leave. They would remain in the Gokoku-ji for seven years.

Bettelheim kept the rightful residents of the temple, and lay worshipers, away in part by accusing them of seeking importune glimpses of his wife. He threw out a number of objects he deemed to be "the heathen furniture of idolatry", and considered his occupation of the temple, against the wishes of the local officials, a small victory for Christianity, over this heathen nation.

While on Okinawa, a second daughter was born to the Bettelheims on December 8, 1848. She was named Lucy Fanny Loochoo and carries the distinction of being the first European to be born on Okinawa. Liu Yu-Kan, Bettelheim's interpreter, left Okinawa in March 1849 after conflict developed between him and the family and began working with Okinawa authorities against Bettelheim's interests. Bettelheim sought to ingratiate himself to the local officials by offering to teach a variety of subjects, including English, geography, and astronomy, and to offer medical services for the locals, but was refused; he was, however, provided a tutor for the study of Chinese. His attitude and actions towards the Okinawan authorities has been described as rude and extravagant, and one foreign visitor to the island noted that Bettelheim and the authorities were "living in a state of undisguised hostility". Locals were forbidden from selling to foreigners, and merchants often abandoned their stands when the Bettelheims approached, for fear of being accused of dealing with the foreigners; the Bettelheims simply took whatever they desired, and left as much coin as they deemed fit. The doctor also developed a habit of invading private homes where he sought to preach. He disturbed public meetings, distributed pamphlets which were confiscated by the metsuke (magistrates) and preached loudly outside the gates to Shuri Castle. On one occasion, after being thrown out of a private home, he was beaten and stoned by a number of guards. Soon, a guardpost was established just outside the Gokoku-ji, and guards were assigned to accompany Dr. Bettelheim as he journeyed around Naha, Shuri, and the surrounding countryside. Before long, he attracted the attention of the lords of Satsuma Domain in Japan, to which the Ryūkyū Kingdom was a vassal, as well as the Chinese authorities in Fukien, who took up the matter with British officials in Canton and Hong Kong; the doctor's embarrassing activities were obscured from his sponsors and related organizations in London, for a time.

Throughout his time on Okinawa, Bettelheim kept diaries zealously, and remained in contact with his British sponsors, writing numerous letters. He claimed to have mastered the Okinawan language, to have written a translation of the Scriptures into Okinawan (in kana script), and to have engaged common Okinawan people in intense theological debate, though historian George H. Kerr expressed doubts; these claims were more likely gross exaggerations, misconceptions on Bettelheim's part, or pure fictions. He faced a great many obstacles in Okinawa, and blamed most of these difficulties on the Ryukyuan government, accusing them of conspiring against him, or chose to view them as his being tested by God or foiled by the Devil. He deemed himself interpreter for any Westerners who should arrive, rushing down to the beach upon seeing such a ship. He was also often made to translate petitions from the Ryukyuan government asking the newly arrived foreigners to take Dr. Bettelheim with them; he is said to have translated and delivered these petitions faithfully and unashamedly.

By 1849, Bettelheim's activities came to the attention of the highest Cabinet levels in London. Despite a great personal distaste for Bettelheim on the part of several high officials, an opportunity was seen to somehow take advantage of the situation to press for use of Naha as a neutral trading ground, and as a stepping stone or base of operations from which to apply pressure to Japan. Efforts were made to use Bettelheim as an intermediary to these ends, but the Ryukyuan government refused to trade, citing their laws against it (imposed upon them as part of Japan's kaikin policy) and their lack of surplus goods to trade; in addition, British authorities soon came to realize that Bettelheim was essentially useless, having no true knowledge of the workings of the kingdom or its trade policies, and no significant successes as a missionary. It was decided that the only dangers to Bettelheim were those he brought upon himself, but in the end Queen Victoria's government decided to send ships now and then to look after him. In response to these visits, and other factors, Ryukyuan controls over Bettelheim and the Gokoku-ji were tightened, and his interactions with the Ryukyuan government or common people severely reduced.

When Commodore Matthew Perry came to Japan in 1854, Bettelheim went aboard his ship to meet him. As before, through his understanding of the language and culture, Bettelheim presented himself as uniquely qualified to present the Ryukyuan position on various matters to the Americans. Bettelheim clashed with various members of Perry's mission, particularly the Chinese-language translator S. Wells Williams, and with the Ryukyuan government in his efforts to aid the Americans; at one point he helped a number of Americans break into a schoolhouse in Tomari with the intention of making it into lodgings for the Americans; they were ultimately refused and expelled from the schoolhouse by local officials. He was, however, quite deferential to Perry and aimed to aid him however possible. Despite being disfavored by the local government, Perry was determined to use Bettelheim to serve the interests of the United States of America. Bettelheim was helpful to Perry as an advisor, representative and commercial agent.

After Japan
Much to the relief of the Okinawa government, Mrs. Bettelheim and the children departed the island in February 1854, on board the USS Supply bound for Shanghai; Bernard followed them in July 1854, Commodore Perry having finally given in to a Ryukyuan entreaty that he take Dr. Bettelheim away. Bettelheim intended to return to England but eventually ended up in New York. After a few years he relocated his family to a farm in Illinois. From August to December, 1863, he served as a surgeon in the 106th Regiment, Illinois Volunteer Infantry. After the American Civil War he relocated to Odell, Illinois, and operated a drugstore, occasionally giving lectures about Okinawa and Japan. Later, the Bettelheims moved to Brookfield, Missouri. Bettelheim died February 9, 1870, at age 59 and is buried with his wife in Brookfield, Missouri.

In May 1926 a memorial to honor Bettelheim was unveiled on the grounds of his former residence on Okinawa at the Gokoku-ji.

References
"Bettelheim." Okinawa rekishi jinmei jiten (沖縄歴史人名事典, "Encyclopedia of People of Okinawan History"). Naha: Okinawa Bunka-sha, 1996. p69.
Kerr, George H. (2000). Okinawa: the History of an Island People. (revised ed.) Boston: Tuttle Publishing.

External links

 www.baxleystamps.com

British Protestant missionaries
American Protestant missionaries
Protestant missionaries in Japan
Hungarian Protestant missionaries
British expatriates in Japan
Hungarian expatriates in Japan
Converts to Protestantism from Judaism
Naturalised citizens of the United Kingdom
British people of Hungarian descent
American people of Hungarian-Jewish descent
Hungarian people of Jewish descent
Clergy from Bratislava
1811 births
1870 deaths
People from Okinawa Prefecture
Christian medical missionaries
People from Brookfield, Missouri